Bukanovskoye Zagotzerno is a rural locality (a settlement) in Bukanovskoye Rural Settlement, Kumylzhensky District, Volgograd Oblast, Russia. The population was 77 as of 2010.

Geography 
Bukanovskoye Zagotzerno is located in forest steppe, on Khopyorsko-Buzulukskaya Plain, 46 km southwest of Kumylzhenskaya (the district's administrative centre) by road. Zimovnoy is the nearest rural locality.

References 

Rural localities in Kumylzhensky District